Lakes of ethane and methane on Titan, Saturn's largest moon, have been detected by the Cassini–Huygens space probe, and had been suspected long before. The large ones are known as maria (seas) and the small ones as lacūs (lakes).

History and Discovery

The possibility that there were seas on Titan was first suggested based on data from the Voyager 1 and 2 space probes, launched in August and September 1977. The data showed Titan to have a thick atmosphere of approximately the correct temperature and composition to support them.  Direct evidence was not obtained until 1995 when data from the Hubble Space Telescope and other observations had already suggested the existence of liquid methane on Titan, either in disconnected pockets or on the scale of satellite-wide oceans, similar to water on Earth.

The Cassini mission affirmed the former hypothesis, although not immediately. When the probe arrived in the Saturnian system in 2004, it was hoped that hydrocarbon lakes or oceans might be detectable by reflected sunlight from the surface of any liquid bodies, but no specular reflections were initially observed.

The possibility remained that liquid ethane and methane might be found on Titan's polar regions, where they were expected to be abundant and stable. In Titan's south polar region, an enigmatic dark feature named Ontario Lacus was the first suspected lake identified, possibly created by clouds that are observed to cluster in the area. A possible shoreline was also identified near the pole via radar imagery. Following a flyby on July 22, 2006, in which the Cassini spacecraft's radar imaged the northern latitudes, which were at the time in winter. A number of large, smooth (and thus dark to radar) patches were seen dotting the surface near the pole. Based on the observations, scientists announced "definitive evidence of lakes filled with methane on Saturn's moon Titan" in January 2007. The Cassini–Huygens team concluded that the imaged features are almost certainly the long-sought hydrocarbon lakes, the first stable bodies of surface liquid found off Earth. Some appear to have channels associated with liquid and lie in topographical depressions. Channels in some regions have created surprisingly little erosion, suggesting erosion on Titan is extremely slow, or some other recent phenomena may have wiped out older riverbeds and landforms. Overall, the Cassini radar observations have shown that lakes cover only a few percent of the surface and are concentrated near the poles, making Titan much dryer than Earth. The high relative humidity of methane in Titan's lower atmosphere could be maintained by evaporation from lakes covering only 0.002–0.02% of the whole surface.

A flyby of Titan's southern polar regions in October 2007 revealed similar, though far smaller, lakelike features.

During a close Cassini flyby in December 2007 the visual and mapping instrument observed a lake, Ontario Lacus, in Titan's south polar region. This instrument identifies chemically different materials based on the way they absorb and reflect infrared light. It may thus resemble a terrestrial mudflat.

Chemical composition and surface roughness of the lakes
According to Cassini data, scientists announced on February 13, 2008, that Titan hosts within its polar lakes "hundreds of times more natural gas and other liquid hydrocarbons than all the known oil and natural gas reserves on Earth." The desert sand dunes along the equator, while devoid of open liquid, nonetheless hold more organics than all of Earth's coal reserves. It has been estimated that the visible lakes and seas of Titan contain about 300 times the volume of Earth's proven oil reserves. In June 2008, Cassini Visible and Infrared Mapping Spectrometer confirmed the presence of liquid ethane beyond doubt in a lake in Titan's southern hemisphere. The exact blend of hydrocarbons in the lakes is unknown. According to a computer model, 3/4 of an average polar lake is ethane, with 10 percent methane, 7 percent propane and smaller amounts of hydrogen cyanide, butane, nitrogen and argon. Benzene is expected to fall like snow and quickly dissolve into the lakes, although the lakes may become saturated just as the Dead Sea on Earth is packed with salt. The excess benzene would then build up in a mud-like sludge on the shores and on the lake floors before eventually being eroded by ethane rain, forming a complex cave-riddled landscape. Salt-like compounds composed of ammonia and acetylene are also predicted to form.

No waves were initially detected by Cassini as the northern lakes emerged from winter darkness (calculations indicate wind speeds of less than  should whip up detectable waves in Titan's ethane lakes but none were observed). This may be either due to low seasonal winds or solidification of hydrocarbons. Titan has several lakes that reside near its northern pole that vary in size, the area these lakes cover and lower wind speeds could as well explain why there were no surface waves being detected. The area over a liquid that wind blows across is known as fetch. The larger this area is, the larger waves become as wind has more area to blow across to transfer energy. The smaller the area of fetch, the smaller waves will be. The optical properties of solid methane surface (close to the melting point) are quite close to the properties of liquid surface however the viscosity of solid methane, even near the melting point, is many orders of magnitude higher, which might explain extraordinary smoothness of the surface. Solid methane is denser than liquid methane so it will eventually sink. It is possible that the methane ice could float for a time as it probably contains bubbles of nitrogen gas from Titan's atmosphere. Temperatures close to the freezing point of methane could lead to both floating and sinking ice - that is, a hydrocarbon ice crust above the liquid and blocks of hydrocarbon ice on the bottom of the lake bed. The ice is predicted to rise to the surface again at the onset of spring before melting.

Since 2014, Cassini has detected transient features in scattered patches in Kraken Mare, Ligeia Mare and Punga Mare. Laboratory experiments suggest these features (e.g. RADAR-bright "magic islands") might be vast patches of bubbles caused by the rapid release of nitrogen dissolved in the lakes. Bubble outburst events are predicted to occur as the lakes cool and subsequently warm or whenever methane-rich fluids mix with ethane-rich ones due to heavy rainfall. Bubble outburst events may also influence the formation of Titan's river deltas. Post-Cassini analysis of VIMS data suggests tidal currents may also be responsible for the generation of persistent waves in narrow channels (Freta) of Kraken Mare.

The results call into question the early summer's classification as the beginning of the Titan's windy season, because high winds probably would have made for larger waves. A 2019 theoretical study concluded that it is possible that the relatively dense aerosols raining down on Titan's lakes may have liquid-repelling properties, forming a persistent film on the surface of the lakes which then would inhibit formation of waves larger than a few centimetres in wavelength.

Observation of specular reflections

The signals were much stronger than anticipated and saturated the probe's receiver. From this it was surmised that surface winds in the area are minimal at that season and/or the lake fluid is more viscous than expected.

On 8 July 2009, Cassini Visual and Infrared Mapping Spectrometer (VIMS) observed a specular reflection in 5 µm infrared light off a northern hemisphere body of liquid at 71° N, 337° W. This has been described as at the southern shoreline of Kraken Mare, but on a combined radar-VIMS image the location is shown as a separate lake (later named Jingpo Lacus). The observation was made shortly after the north polar region emerged from 15 years of winter darkness. Because of the polar location of the reflecting liquid body, the observation required a phase angle close to 180°.

Equatorial in-situ observations by the Huygens probe
The discoveries in the polar regions contrast with the findings of the Huygens probe, which landed near Titan's equator on January 14, 2005. The images taken by the probe during its descent showed no open areas of liquid, but strongly indicated the presence of liquids in the recent past, showing pale hills crisscrossed with dark drainage channels that lead into a wide, flat, darker region. It was initially thought that the dark region might be a lake of a fluid or at least tar-like substance, but it is now clear that Huygens landed on the dark region, and that it is solid without any indication of liquids. A penetrometer studied the composition of the surface as the craft impacted it, and it was initially reported that the surface was similar to wet clay, or perhaps crème brûlée (that is, a hard crust covering a sticky material). Subsequent analysis of the data suggests that this reading was likely caused by Huygens displacing a large pebble as it landed, and that the surface is better described as a "sand" made of ice grains. The images taken after the probe's landing show a flat plain covered in pebbles. The pebbles may be made of water ice and are somewhat rounded, which may indicate the action of fluids. Thermometers indicated that heat was wicked away from Huygens so quickly that the ground must have been damp, and one image shows light reflected by a dewdrop as it falls across the camera's field of view. So Titan's weather is expected to feature downpours of several meters (15–20 feet) causing flash floods, interspersed by decades or centuries of drought (whereas typical weather on Earth includes a little rain most weeks). Cassini has observed equatorial rainstorms only once since 2004. Despite this, a number of long-standing tropical hydrocarbon lakes were unexpectedly discovered in 2012 (including one near the Huygens landing site in the Shangri-La region which is about half the size of Utah's Great Salt Lake, with a depth of at least 1 meter [3'4"]). As on Earth, the likely supplier is probably underground aquifers, in other words the arid equatorial regions of Titan contain "oases".

Impact of Titan's methane cycle and geology on lake formation

Models of oscillations in Titan's atmospheric circulation suggest that over the course of a Saturnian year, liquid is transported from the equatorial region to the poles, where it falls as rain. This might account for the equatorial region's relative dryness.
According to a computer model, intense rainstorms should occur in normally rainless equatorial areas during Titan's vernal and autumnal equinoxes—enough liquid to carve out the type of channels that Huygens found. The model also predicts energy from the Sun will evaporate liquid methane from Titan's surface except at the poles, where the relative absence of sunlight makes it easier for liquid methane to accumulate into permanent lakes. The model also apparently explains why there are more lakes in the northern hemisphere. Due to the eccentricity of Saturn's orbit, the northern summer is longer than the southern summer and consequently the rainy season is longer in the north.

However, recent Cassini observations (from 2013) suggest geology may also explain the geographic distribution of the lakes and other surface features. One puzzling feature of Titan is the lack of impact craters at the poles and mid-latitudes, particularly at lower elevations. These areas may be wetlands fed by subsurface ethane and methane springs. Any crater created by meteorites is thus quickly subsumed by wet sediment. The presence of underground aquifers could explain another mystery. Titan's atmosphere is full of methane, which according to calculations should react with ultraviolet radiation from the sun to produce liquid ethane. Over time, the moon should have built up an ethane ocean hundreds of meters (1,500 to 2,500 feet) deep instead of only a handful of polar lakes. The presence of wetlands would suggest that the ethane soaks into the ground, forming a subsurface liquid layer akin to groundwater on Earth. A possibility is that the formation of materials called clathrates changes the chemical composition of the rainfall runoff that charges the subsurface hydrocarbon "aquifers." This process leads to the formation of reservoirs of propane and ethane that may feed into some rivers and lakes. The chemical transformations taking place underground would affect Titan's surface. Lakes and rivers fed by springs from propane or ethane subsurface reservoirs would show the same kind of composition, whereas those fed by rainfall would be different and contain a significant fraction of methane.

All but 3% of Titan's lakes have been found within a bright unit of terrain covering about  near the north pole. The lakes found here have very distinctive shapes—rounded complex silhouettes and steep sides—suggesting deformation of the crust created fissures that could be filled up with liquid. A variety of formation mechanisms have been proposed. The explanations range from the collapse of land after a cryovolcanic eruption to karst terrain, where liquids dissolve soluble ice. Smaller lakes (up to tens of miles across) with steep rims (up to hundreds of feet high) might be analogous to maar lakes, i.e. explosion craters subsequently filled with liquid. The explosions are proposed to result from fluctuations in climate, which lead to pockets of liquid nitrogen accumulating within the crust during colder periods and then exploding when warming caused the nitrogen to rapidly expand as it shifted to a gas state.

Titan Mare Explorer
Titan Mare Explorer (TiME) was a proposed NASA/ESA lander that would splash down on Ligeia Mare and analyze its surface, shoreline and Titan's atmosphere. However, it was turned down in August 2012, when NASA instead selected the InSight mission to Mars.

Named lakes and seas

Features labeled lacus are believed to be ethane/methane lakes, while features labeled lacuna are believed to be dry lake beds. Both are named after lakes on Earth.
Features labeled sinus are bays within the lakes or seas. They are named after bays and fjords on Earth.
Features labeled insula are islands within the body of liquid. They are named after mythical islands.
Titanean maria (large hydrocarbon seas) are named after sea monsters in world mythology. The tables are up-to-date as of 2020.

Sea names of Titan

Lake names of Titan

Lakebed names of Titan

Bay names of Titan

Island names of Titan

Image gallery

See also
List of largest lakes and seas in the Solar System
Tar pit

Notes

References

External links
Map of Titan's north polar liquid bodies with feature names from USGS Titan system page